The United States National Geodetic Survey lists thirteen craters in the state of Alaska.

Aleutians East Borough

Fisher Caldera is located on Unimak Island and named for American geologist Bernard Fisher, who died on June 22, 1946, while exploring the Umnak Pass.

Aleutians West Census Area
Okmok Caldera

Bethel Census Area
Binalik Crater is located on Nunivak Island. It was named by the Yupik people, and reported in 1937.
Ikathiwik Crater
Nanwaksjiak Crater

Kodiak Island

Kaguyak Crater

Lake and Peninsula Borough
Aniakchak Crater
Novarupta
Ukinrek Maars

Nome Census Area
Twin Calderas

Valdez-Cordova Census Area
East Crater
Mount Wrangell
North Crater

References

See also
 Avak crater - confirmed impact crater near Barrow

Alaska
Alaska geography-related lists